Waiting for a World War is the debut album released by indie rock band Dolour. The album was produced by Blake Wescott and Dolour. The artwork was done by Jesse LeDoux.

Track listing

All songs written by Shane Tutmarc (BMI)

 So, So Sad
 Sophie
 Baby U Rescued Me
 (No) Ordinary People
 Ride The Black Stallion
 Cleopatra Eyes
 Ready to Fly
 Now You're On Your Own
 Old Age
 Low Flying Planes
 (Who Really Cares?)

Musicians
 Shane Tutmarc — guitar, vocals, electric piano, synthesizer, percussion
 Joe Gregory — bass
 Paul Mumaw — drums

Additional keys and percussion by Casey Foubert and Blake Wescott

References 

2001 albums
Dolour albums